Dato' Ng Keng Heng is Malaysian Chinese Association (MCA) member from Kota Tinggi, Johor, Malaysia. Ng Keng Heng is Malaysian Chinese Association Johor State Liaison Committee Secretary and MCA Kota Tinggi Division Chief.

References

External links 
 

Living people
Malaysian Chinese Association politicians
People from Johor
Year of birth missing (living people)